Beth Hamedrash Hagodol Synagogue was an Orthodox Jewish congregation located at 370 Garden Street in Hartford, Connecticut. Founded in 1905, the congregation built the Romanesque temple on Garden Street in 1921–22. The congregation merged with the Ateres Kneset Israel congregation in 1962 to form the United Synagogue of Greater Hartford, and moved to new quarters in West Hartford. Its building, listed on the National Register of Historic Places for its architecture, is now home to the Greater Refuge Church of Christ.

Architecture and history
The former Beth Hamedrash Hagodol building is located in Hartford's Clay-Arsenal neighborhood, on the east side of Garden Street north of Albany Avenue (United States Route 44). It is a brick building, two stories in height, with Romanesque styling. Its front facade has slightly projecting square corner towers, with paired narrow round-arch windows on each level. Stairs rise in between the towers to three entrances, each set in a rounded arch. On the second level above the entrances is a central circular window with Star of David tracery at its center, with flanking paired round-arch windows.

The congregation was established in 1905 on Hartford's East Side, originally meeting in a space on Wooster Street. In 1921 it merged with Sharah Torah, another Orthodox congregation, and the combination built this synagogue in 1922 to be nearer the homes of its congregants. The building was designed by Julius Berenson and Jacob Moses, Jewish architects active in Hartford. It was the first of two synagogues they are known to have designed; the other was located on Greenfield Street. The congregation was again merged with other Orthodox congregations in the 1960s, which established the United Synagogue of Greater Hartford in West Hartford. This building is now owned by the Greater Refuge Church of Christ.

See also
 National Register of Historic Places listings in Hartford, Connecticut

References

External links
 Greater Refuge Church of Christ web site

Synagogues on the National Register of Historic Places in Connecticut
Romanesque Revival architecture in Connecticut
Synagogues completed in 1922
Churches in Hartford, Connecticut
Former synagogues in Connecticut
National Register of Historic Places in Hartford, Connecticut
Romanesque Revival synagogues